The 2004 British Rally Championship season was the 46th season of the British Rally Championship.  The season consisted of eight rounds and began on 23 April, with the Pirelli International Rally in the north east of England.  The season ended on 6 November, at the Tempest South of England Rally.

The title was won by Manxman David Higgins.

Entry list

Calendar
 Pirelli International Rally – 23–24 April
 International Rally of Wales - 15–16 May
 RSAC Scottish Rally – 4–6 June
 Jim Clark Memorial Rally – 2–3 July
 Manx International Rally – 29–31 July
 The AnswerCall Direct International Ulster Rally – 3–4 September
 Trackrod Rally Yorkshire – 2–3 October
 Tempest South of England Rally – 5–6 November

References

British Rally Championship seasons
Rally Championship
British Rally Championship